
Snub-nosed monkeys are a group of Old World monkeys and make up the entirety of the genus Rhinopithecus. The genus is rare and not fully researched. Some taxonomists group snub-nosed monkeys together with the genus Pygathrix.

Snub-nosed monkeys live in Asia, with a range covering southern China (especially Tibet, Sichuan, Yunnan, and Guizhou) extending into the northern parts of Myanmar and Vietnam.

These monkeys are named for the short stump of a nose on their round faces, with nostrils arranged forward. They have relatively multicolored and long fur, particularly at the shoulders and backs.

In the winter, they move into the deeply secluded regions. Higher elevation areas are more remote and difficult for humans to access and utilize and other studies have found less deforestation, more reforestation and afforestation, less range contraction, and less extinction in topographically steep areas. All Rhinopithecus species inhabit primary forest and grid cells with tree cover ≥ 75% might constitute important potential habitat. They spend the majority of their life in the trees. They live together in very large groups of up to 600 members, splitting up into smaller groups in times of food-scarcity, such as in the winter. Groups consist of many more males than females. They have territorial instincts, defending their territory mostly with shouts. They have a large vocal repertoire, calling sometimes solo while at other times together in choir-like fashion. The golden and black-and-white snub-nosed monkeys are both endangered species, while the other three species are critically endangered.

The diet of these animals consists mainly of tree needles, bamboo buds, fruits and leaves. A multi-chambered stomach helps them with digesting their food.

The impulse for mating starts with the female. She takes up eye contact with the male and runs away a short bit, then flashes her genitals. If the male shows interest (which does not always occur), he joins the female and they mate. The 200-day gestation period ends with a single birth in late spring or early summer. Young animals become fully mature in about six to seven years. Zoologists know little about their lifespan.

Golden snub-nosed monkey communities with large populations have high genetic diversity, but also show higher levels of recent inbreeding than other snub-nosed monkeys.

Species
 Genus Rhinopithecus
Golden snub-nosed monkey, Rhinopithecus roxellana
 Moupin golden snub-nosed monkey, Rhinopithecus roxellana roxellana
 Qinling golden snub-nosed monkey, Rhinopithecus roxellana qinlingensis
 Hubei golden snub-nosed monkey, Rhinopithecus roxellana hubeiensis
 Black-and-white snub-nosed monkey, Rhinopithecus bieti
 Gray snub-nosed monkey, Rhinopithecus brelichi
 Tonkin snub-nosed monkey, Rhinopithecus avunculus
 Myanmar or black snub-nosed monkey, Rhinopithecus strykeri

See also
Wildlife of China

References

External links

 Primate Info Net Rhinopithecus Factsheets